The 2003 Tour de Georgia was the inaugural edition of what has now become the highest ranked bicycle road racing event in the United States. The six-stage race was held April 22 through April 27, 2003, with the overall title won by Chris Horner of the Saturn Cycling Team. American Fred Rodriguez claimed the points jersey for sprinters. Also, Horner won the King of the Mountains competition for climbers. Saul Raisin won the Best Young Rider competition.

Stages
Prologue 4.2 km Circuit Race, Savannah, Georgia
 Winner: Nathan O'Neill, Saturn Cycling Team

 Stage 1 220 km Stage Race, Augusta to Macon
 Winner: Henk Vogels, Navigators Cycling Team

General classification after stage 1:
Henk Vogels (Aus) Navigators Cycling Team                    5.33.16
Nathan O'Neill (Aus) Saturn Cycling Team                        0.01
Chris Horner (USA) Saturn Cycling Team                          0.03

 Stage 2 199 km Stage Race, Macon to Columbus
 Winner: Moreno Di Biase, Formaggi Pinzolo Fiavé

General classification after stage 2:

Henk Vogels (Aus) Navigators Cycling Team                   9.40.57
Chris Horner (USA) Saturn Cycling Team                         0.04
Nathan O'Neill (Aus) Saturn Cycling Team                       0.05

 Stage 3 222 km Stage Race, Pine Mountain/Callaway to Rome
 Winner: Fred Rodriguez, 

General classification after stage 3

Henk Vogels (Aus) Navigators Cycling Team                   15.08.35
Chris Horner (USA) Saturn Cycling Team                          0.06
Nathan O'Neill (Aus) Saturn Cycling Team                        0.07

 Stage 4 196 km Stage Race, Dalton to Gainesville
 Winner: Fred Rodriguez, Caldirola-Sidermec-Saunier Duval

General classification after stage 4

Chris Horner (USA) Saturn Cycling Team                      19.57.57
Nathan O'Neill (Aus) Saturn Cycling Team                        0.12
Roland Green (Can) US Postal presented by Berry Floor           0.18

 Stage 5 142 km Circuit Race, Atlanta, Georgia
 Winner: David Clinger, Prime Alliance Cycling Team

Stage Winners Progress

Yellow Jersey Progress

Final Results

General Classification

Points Classification

King of The Mountains Classification

Team Competition 

 Sierra Nevada Clif Bar
 Prime Alliance Cycling Team
 Rabobank
 Flanders-IteamNova.com Cycling Team
 7UP / Maxxis
 Jelly Belly Carlsbad Clothing
 Saturn Cycling Team
 OFOTO Lombardi Sports
 Formaggi Pinzolo
 Schroeder Iron Cycling Team
 West Virginia Pro Cycling
 Navigators Insurance Cycling Team
 
 Dutch National Cycling Team
 U.S. Postal Service Pro Cycling Team presented by Berry Floor
 Colavita Bolla
 Webcor Builders

References

External links 
cyclingnews
Tour de Georgia official site
Tour de Georgia blog

Tour de Georgia
2003 in road cycling
2003 in American sports